High Westwood railway station served the village of High Westwood, County Durham, England from 1909 to 1942 on the Derwent Valley Railway.

History 
The station opened on 1 July 1909 by the North Eastern Railway. The station was situated at the end of a track running from Derwent Crescent. The platforms were made of timber and it was on a hill above the village. The station was the first on the line to close; it closed to passengers on 4 May 1942  while the other stations survived and closed to goods traffic on 11 November 1963.

References

External links 

Disused railway stations in County Durham
Former North Eastern Railway (UK) stations
Railway stations in Great Britain opened in 1909
Railway stations in Great Britain closed in 1942
1909 establishments in England
1942 disestablishments in England
Consett